Rough and Ready Volume 2 is a studio album released by Shabba Ranks. This album was not as successful as Volume 1 and it was going to be difficult to create an album as successful as its predecessor, X-tra Naked, which won a Grammy. Volume 2 was criticised for lacking variety.

Track listing

References

1993 albums
Shabba Ranks albums
Epic Records albums